2020 Maine Question 1 was a people's veto referendum that sought to reject a new law which eliminated religious and philosophical exemptions from school vaccination requirements and for employees of nursery schools and health care facilities. The question appeared on the March 3, 2020 statewide ballot.

The vote coincided with the Democratic and Republican presidential primaries for the U.S. presidential election in November 2020.

The veto effort was defeated 73%-27%.

LD 798
On April 23, 2019, The Maine House of Representatives voted 78-59 to pass LD 798, "An Act To Protect Maine Children and Students from Preventable Diseases by Repealing Certain Exemptions from the Laws Governing Immunization Requirements". The bill was sponsored by Ryan Tipping (D-Orono).

The Maine State Senate passed the bill 20-15 on May 2 but amended it to keep religious exemptions. The House rejected the amendment on May 7 and sent the bill back to the Senate.

On May 23, the Senate reversed course and passed the bill, without the religious exemption, by a vote of 19-16. On May 24, 2019, Maine governor Janet Mills signed the bill into law effective September 2021. Maine thus became the fourth state in the US to allow only medical exemptions for school immunization requirements.

Petition effort
Prior to the September 19, 2019 deadline, opponents of the new law submitted 95,071 signatures to Maine Secretary of State Matthew Dunlap. Of those, 79,000 were deemed valid, surpassing the 63,067 required for the veto effort to be included on a statewide ballot. (In Maine, a number of valid signatures equalling 10% of the votes cast in the previous gubernatorial election are required for a people's veto to be accepted for inclusion on a statewide ballot.)

Date of the vote 
While signatures were being gathered, Dunlap's office told organizers of the veto effort that, if qualified for the ballot, the vote would coincide with state legislative and congressional primary elections in June 2020. However, that guidance failed to take into account the recent change in the law to hold primary elections for presidential nominees, as opposed to a caucus, on the March 3 Super Tuesday. Thus the referendum vote would be held on March 3, as it was the next scheduled statewide election. Dunlap's office admitted to the error, but said that it has no discretion over when to schedule elections and explained that timing is generally not discussed until petitions are submitted and validated, which had not happened yet.

Yes vs. No

"Yes on 1 to Reject Big Pharma"
Supporters of the veto campaign, who wished to restore religious and philosophical exemptions for required vaccination, became "Yes on 1 to Reject Big Pharma."

"No on 1 to Protect Maine's Children"
Opponents of the veto, who wished to allow only medical exemptions for required vaccination, became "No on 1 to Protect Maine's Children."

Campaign
On February 4, 2020, campaigns on both sides of the referendum held campaign kickoff events at the Maine State House.

Yes on 1 was endorsed by state senators Matthew Pouliot (R-Kennebec) & Lisa Keim (R-Oxford); state representatives Robert Foley (R-Wells), Justin Fecteau (R-Augusta) and Heidi Sampson (R-Alfred); and Christiane Northrup.

No on 1 was endorsed by the Maine Medical Association, the Maine Dental Association, the Maine Hospital Association, the Maine Osteopathic Association, the Barbara Bush Children's Hospital, the Maine Association of School Nurses, the American Academy of Pediatrics, EqualityMaine, Governor Janet Mills the Bangor Daily News, the Portland Press Herald, and The Ellsworth American.

Supporters of the veto raised over $640,000 while the opposition raised close to $875,000.

Results
The veto effort was defeated 73% (281,750) to 27% (105,214). A total of 386,964 votes were cast.

References

External links
 Ballotpedia: Maine Question 1, Religious and Philosophical Vaccination Exemptions Referendum (March 2020)
 States with religious and philosophical exemptions from school immunization requirements, National Conference of State Legislators
 Mainers for Health and Parental Rights
 Maine Families for Vaccines

Vaccination in the United States
2020 Maine ballot measures
Vaccine controversies
Public health in the United States